The 1994 European Cup was the 15th edition of the European Cup of athletics. From this edition on, the event was held annually until 2011.

The Super League Finals were held in Birmingham, Great Britain between 25–26 June 1994. The first two teams qualified for the 1994 IAAF World Cup.

Super League
Held on 25 and 26 June in Birmingham, United Kingdom.

Team standings

Results summary

Men's events

Women's events

First League
First League was held on 11 and 12 June in Valencia, Spain Thanks to the expansion of the First League to two Groups from the next edition, no teams needed to be relegated.

Second League
The Second League was held on 12 and 13 June

Men

Group 1
Held in Dublin, Ireland

Group 2
Held in Istanbul, Turkey

Group 3
Held in Lubljana, Slovenia

Women

Group 1
Held in Dublin, Ireland

Group 2
Held in Istanbul, Turkey

Group 3
Held in Lubljana, Slovenia

References

External links
European Cup results (Men) from GBR Athletics
European Cup results (Women) from GBR Athletics

European Cup (athletics)
European Cup
1994 in British sport
International athletics competitions hosted by England
International sports competitions in Birmingham, West Midlands
June 1994 sports events in the United Kingdom
1990s in Birmingham, West Midlands